Trempealeau National Wildlife Refuge is a  National Wildlife Refuge located along the Upper Mississippi River in extreme southern Buffalo County and extreme southwestern Trempealeau County in Wisconsin, United States.

It is in part a wetland consisting of backwaters away from the Mississippi and Trempealeau River, and is a significant element of the Mississippi Flyway. It is part of the Driftless Area, a portion of North America which remained free of ice during the last ice age, creating in part the deep gorge of the Mississippi, quite visible from this refuge.

Images

References

External links

 Trempealeau National Wildlife Refuge

Protected areas of Buffalo County, Wisconsin
Protected areas of Trempealeau County, Wisconsin
Driftless Area
National Wildlife Refuges in Wisconsin
Protected areas on the Mississippi River
Wetlands of Wisconsin
Landforms of Buffalo County, Wisconsin
Landforms of Trempealeau County, Wisconsin
Protected areas established in 1936
1936 establishments in Wisconsin